The 1990 Northeast Conference men's basketball tournament was held February 27-March 1, 1990. The tournament featured the top six teams from the 9-team conference. Robert Morris won their second consecutive and fourth overall ECAC Metro/NEC tournament championship, and received the conference's automatic bid to the 1990 NCAA tournament.

Format
The NEC Men’s Basketball Tournament consisted of a six-team playoff format with all games played at the venue of the higher seed. The top two seeds received a bye in the first round.

Bracket

References

Northeast Conference men's basketball tournament
Tournament
Northeast Conference men's basketball tournament
Northeast Conference men's basketball tournament
Northeast Conference men's basketball tournament